The Dow Event Center (formerly known as Saginaw County Event Center and Saginaw Civic Center) is an indoor arena located in Saginaw, Michigan. The center consists of several parts: The Atrium, The Garden Room, The Theater, The Red Room, Huntington Event Park, and The Arena. It currently houses the Ontario Hockey League's Saginaw Spirit. The facility has housed a number of hockey teams in the past, such as the Saginaw Lumber Kings and both the IHL and UHL incarnations of the Saginaw Gears.

The Arena At The Dow Event Center has a capacity of 7,600 people for concerts (without the ice), and 5,500 for hockey games. The Theater at the Dow Event Center has a capacity of 2,276 people.

Originally built in 1972 as part of an urban development program, the center is the only structure left. Most of the other buildings were razed in the 1980s due to many problems, including health risks, foreclosure and bankruptcy.

For a time in the 1990s, the facility nearly faced foreclosure and bankruptcy due to lack of funds provided by the city.  The facility underwent a series of renovations in early 2000s, mainly in hopes for a better facility to host their newly acquired hockey team.  The naming rights of the facility were transferred in September 2004 to The Dow Chemical Company, headquartered in nearby Midland.  The center was used two times during the summer of 2004 as a center for Republican political rallies in support for the re-election of U.S. President George W. Bush.

Voters transferred the ownership from the City of Saginaw to Saginaw County on May 8, 2001. The city then closed the facility on June 30, 2001, and the county reopened it on July 1. The county then appointed SMG Worldwide to manage the facility, and started updating and renovating the building. The total cost of the renovations was tagged at $17 million, and they were completed in 2003.

The center hosts many events, concerts, political rallies, and graduations.  Trade shows also take place there; the complex has  of space at Wendler Arena.

It hosted the third WWF In Your House pay-per-view on September 24, 1995.

Jehovah's Witnesses District Conventions are held annually at the Dow Event Center. Starting in mid-June, and ending in early July, three-day conventions held on every weekend in that time will occur. The Jehovah's Witnesses first started using the building in 2005, after rumors of demolition for the Pontiac Silverdome raised concern over where meetings would be held, as the Silverdome was the previous venue.

References

External links
 The Dow Event Center site
 Dow announcement to purchase naming rights
 Dow Event Center press release on naming rights
 Dow Event Center History
 SMG Worldwide Management Group

1972 establishments in Michigan
Buildings and structures in Saginaw County, Michigan
Convention centers in Michigan
Event Center
Indoor ice hockey venues in Michigan
Ontario Hockey League arenas
Sports venues completed in 1972
Sports venues in Michigan
Tourist attractions in Saginaw County, Michigan
Concert halls in Michigan
Indoor arenas in Michigan